Sibley John "Tip" Snooke (1 February 1881 – 14 August 1966) played Test cricket for South Africa as an all-rounder, captaining the side to victory 3–2 against England in a five-Test series in South Africa in 1909–10.  He played in 26 Test matches, playing the first 23 between 1906 and 1912, and he was recalled aged 41 for three further Test matches against England in South Africa in 1922–23.

Snooke was born in St Mark's, Tembuland.  He scored 1,008 Test runs at a batting average of 22.39, including one century against Australia at Adelaide in 1910–11, and took 35 Test wickets at a bowling average of 20.05, with best figures of 8/70 in an innings and 12/127 for a match, both against England at Johannesburg in 1905–06. Four years later against England at Cape Town, he dismissed two batsmen – Wilfred Rhodes and David Denton – in the very first over of a Test match, a feat that was not repeated until nearly ninety years later.

He played 124 first-class cricket matches for Border, Western Province and Transvaal, scoring 4,821 runs at an average of 25.91 and taking 120 wickets at an average of 25.14. He managed the successful South African side in England in 1935.

He died at Port Elizabeth, aged 85.  His brother, Stanley Snooke, also played Test cricket for South Africa.

References

External links
 

1881 births
1966 deaths
Border cricketers
South Africa Test cricket captains
South Africa Test cricketers
South African cricket administrators
Gauteng cricketers
Western Province cricketers
Marylebone Cricket Club cricketers